Khwaja Zakiuddin (1918-2003) was a Bengali aristocrat and Pakistani statesman. He was a member of the Dhaka Nawab family.

Early life
Zakiuddin was born on 9 January 1918. His father was Khwaja Shahabuddin, a Pakistan government Minister, and his mother was Farhat Banu, a member of the Bengal Legislative Assembly. He graduated from the University of Dhaka and then went to University College, London. He survived the London Blitz during World War II.

Career
After returning from London Zakiuddin joined the Grindlays Bank in Bombay in 1943. He was one of the first Indian Muslims to be employed in a British Bank in India. He worked in Grindlays Bank branches in Kolkata, Karachi, and Peshawar. He joined the State Bank of Pakistan in the 1950s. He retired in 1976.

Personal life
Zakiuddin married Begum Binoo, she was the daughter of Khan Bahadur Hafizur Rahman Chowdhury and Abida Khatoon. Zakiuddin and Binoo had two daughters Yasmeen Murshed, and Almas Zakiuddin and one son, Zahed Zakiuddin. His daughter Yasmeen Murshed, served as the ambassador of Bangladesh to Pakistan. Zakiuddins brother was Lieutenant General Khwaja Wasiuddin of Bangladesh Army.

Death
Zakiuddin died on 16 January 2003 in Karachi, Pakistan.

References

1918 births
2003 deaths
Bengali politicians
Members of the Dhaka Nawab family